Jack Aldous (born 3 April 1991) is an English professional rugby league footballer who last played for Hunslet in Betfred League 1.

Playing career

Newcastle Thunder
He previously played for the York City Knights until signing for Newcastle Thunder in October 2016.

Hunslet RLFC
On 26 December 2019 it was announced that Aldous had signed for Hunslet. He signed a new one-year deal with the club for the 2021 season, but made no further appearances for Hunslet due to work commitments.

References

External links
Newcastle Thunder profile

1991 births
Living people
English rugby league players
Hull F.C. players
Hunslet R.L.F.C. players
Newcastle Thunder players
Rugby articles needing expert attention
Rugby league props
York City Knights players